Bryony van Velzen (born 14 May 1996) is a former Dutch professional racing cyclist, who rode four years for UCI Women's Continental Team  and one year for .

See also
 List of 2016 UCI Women's Teams and riders

References

External links
 

1996 births
Living people
Dutch female cyclists
Place of birth missing (living people)
People from Sittard-Geleen
Cyclists from Limburg (Netherlands)